Skyscape may refer to:

Skyscape art, art which depicts representations of the sky
Skyscape (imprint), publishing imprint of Amazon Publishing for children's books
Skyscaping, the arrangement of natural materials to form words visible from the air